Isabela National High School is a public educational institution established in Ilagan, Isabela, Philippines. It was founded in 1904, making it the oldest public high school in the Cagayan Valley region. It was named Isabela High School before it was converted into a national high school in 1982. It is the only educational institution offering the Open High School Program in the entire Cagayan Valley region.
, the school is administered by Gilbert N Tong, the head of the Schools Division of the City of Ilagan. The school's current principal is Silvino B. Cabangan

Education programs 

Isabela National High School implements programs for students who have high aptitudes in certain areas:

 Basic Education Curriculum
 Enhanced Basic Education
 K-12 Program
 Open High School Program (OHSP)
 Science, Technology and Engineering Program
 Special Science Program
 Special Program in the Arts
 Special Program in Journalism

The school is currently implementing grades seven to ten in accordance with the K-12 program of the Department of Education.

Facilities 
These facilities includes the following:
 Open Pavilion is being used for flag raising and flag rites ceremonies, school activity programs, other curricular activities and special announcements from school administrators, announcements from student government leaders including various special guests and visitors.
 Samuel F. Adelan Learning Center houses library materials for use by staff, students and visitors of the school. It was built on the site of the school's old library.
 Multi-purpose Hall is being used for the conduct of school programs and activities administered by the school. Seminars and lectures are usually conducted in this hall.
 Quadrangle houses the Guidance Office and other student services.
 Nuñes Hall houses the administration office, which includes the office of the principal, school registrar's office, and accounting and various offices.
 Computer Laboratory hosts computers for access to the Internet.

Supreme Student Government
Aside from the Supreme Student Government, the Isabela National High School has various student clubs and organizations duly recognized by the school like the following:
 Kapisanang Pilipino
 English Club
 Math Club
 YES-O
 YECS
 STEP
 History Club
 Barkada Kontra Droga
 MAPEH Club
 Red Cross Youth
 Library Club
 Peer-Helper's Circle
 Girl Scouts of the Philippines
 Boy Scouts of the Philippines
 Arts Club
 Drum & Lyre Club
 Youth Rondalla Club
 Jubiloso Choir Club
 Dance Troupe Club

Notable staff 

 Oscar Martinez was a former school principal of Isabela National High School who ran for a public office as City Councilor in Ilagan City but failed to win the Philippine 2013 local election.

References

External links 
 Isabela.ph

Education in Ilagan
Schools in Isabela (province)
1904 establishments in the Philippines